Marcel Alejandro Ruiz Suárez (born 26 October 2000) is a Mexican professional footballer who plays as a midfielder for Liga MX club Toluca.

Club career

Queretaro
A product of the youth Querétaro team, Ruiz would make his senior debut in Liga MX on 21 July 2018 against Atlas, coming in at the 86th minute for Erbín Trejo, finishing the game in a 0–0 tie. On 22 August 2018, he would score his first goal for the team, winning the game against Club Universidad Nacional 1–0, becoming the youngest scorer of the season at the age of 17. On 31 August 2018, he contributed two assists for Camilo Sanvezzo to score the first two goals against Morelia, winning 4–1.

International career

Youth
Ruiz was called up by Diego Ramírez to the under-20 team to participate in a training camp ahead of the 2018 CONCACAF U-20 Championship and matches against Brazil and Japan.

Ruiz was called up by Jaime Lozano to participate with the under-22 team at the 2019 Toulon Tournament, where Mexico finished in third. He was called up by Lozano again to participate at the 2019 Pan American Games, with Mexico winning the third-place match.

Career statistics

Club

Honours
Mexico U23
Pan American Bronze Medal: 2019

References

External links
 
 
 

2000 births
Living people
Association football midfielders
Footballers from Yucatán
Querétaro F.C. footballers
Sportspeople from Mérida, Yucatán
Pan American Games medalists in football
Pan American Games bronze medalists for Mexico
Footballers at the 2019 Pan American Games
Medalists at the 2019 Pan American Games
Mexican footballers